Tolotear Lealamanua  (born ) is a retired Australian female volleyball player, who played as a middle blocker.

She was part of the Australia women's national volleyball team at the 2002 FIVB Volleyball Women's World Championship in Germany. On club level she played with University of Technology, Sydney.

Clubs
 University of Technology, Sydney (2002)

References

1983 births
Living people
Australian women's volleyball players
Place of birth missing (living people)
Middle blockers
University of Technology Sydney alumni